Schwartziella catesbyana, common name Catesby's risso, is a species of minute sea snail, a marine gastropod mollusk or micromollusk in the family Zebinidae.

Distribution
This species occurs in the Caribbean Sea and the Gulf of Mexico, in the Atlantic Ocean along the Mid-Atlantic Ridge and North Carolina to eastern Brazil.

Description 
The size of the shell varies between 2 mm and 7 mm.

Habitat 
The minimum recorded depth for this species is 0 m; maximum recorded depth is 40 m.

References

 Rosenberg, G., F. Moretzsohn, and E. F. García. 2009. Gastropoda (Mollusca) of the Gulf of Mexico, Pp. 579–699 in Felder, D.L. and D.K. Camp (eds.), Gulf of Mexico–Origins, Waters, and Biota. Biodiversity. Texas A&M Press, College Station, Texas.

External links
 

catesbyana
Gastropods described in 1842
Molluscs of the Atlantic Ocean
Molluscs of Brazil